Jo Ann Smith (born May 9, 1939) was inducted into the National Cowgirl Museum and Hall of Fame in 2015. She is the first woman to become the president of the National Cattlemen's Beef Association.

Life
Jo Ann Smith was born Jo Ann Doke was born on May 9, 1939. Smith grew up in Alachua County, Florida. Smith first worked in her family business, Smith Brothers Farming, Ranching, and Construction Companies in Wacahoota, Florida. She worked up her way and started working for several agriculture organizations. From 1970 to 1972, she held the position president of the Florida Cattlewomen's Association. When Jo Ann was 18 years old, she married Cedrik Smith. Cedrik was also from Wacahoota, Florida, a small town just outside Gainesville, Florida. Cedrik came from a family who farmed vegetables and raised cattle. The Smiths raised two children: a son and a daughter.

Career
Smith continued to work in agriculture. In 1985, she was named the Woman of the Year in Agriculture by the Florida Department of Agriculture and Consumer Services. In 1984, she was appointed to the Governor's Task Force on the Future of Florida Agriculture. In 1985, Smith became the first woman to hold the position of president for the National Cattlemen's Beef Association. She was the founding chair of the Cattlemen's Beef Promotion and Research Board. In 1989, she was appointed by President George H. W. Bush as the Assistant Secretary of Marketing and Inspection of the U. S. Department of Agriculture.

Through the 1990s, Smith continued to work at her family's ranch while still working in commercial agriculture. She served on the corporate board of Purina Mills. She also worked on the corporate boards for Iowa Beef Producers and Tyson Foods, Inc. Smith has worked diligently throughout her career to improve issues that affect consumers.

Honors
 1985 Woman of the Year by the Florida Department of Agriculture and Consumer Service
 1990 Golden Spur Award by National Ranching Heritage Center
 1992 Good Government Award from United Fresh Fruit and Vegetable Association
 Outstanding Contributions to American Agriculture Award from the National Agriculture Editors Association
 2005 Florida Agricultural Hall of Fame
 International Stockmen's Educational Foundation Hall of Fame
 2015 Swan Leadership Award by the National Cattleman's Beef Association
 2015 Meat Industry Hall of Fame
 2015 National Cowgirl Museum and Hall of Fame

References 

1939 births
Living people
American cattlewomen
Ranchers
People from Micanopy, Florida
People from Marion County, Florida
People from Alachua County, Florida
Cowgirl Hall of Fame inductees
21st-century American women